Palanga Arena is a multifunctional arena in Palanga, Lithuania. It was opened on April 11, 2014. It was opened for the 3x3 basketball world championship qualification and National Basketball League final four matches.

References 

Indoor arenas in Lithuania
Basketball venues in Lithuania
Buildings and structures in Palanga
Sport in Palanga
Culture in Palanga